Anne Ludvigsson (born 26 October 1950), is a Swedish social democratic politician who was a member of the Riksdag from 2002 to 2010.

References

1950 births
Living people
Members of the Riksdag from the Social Democrats
Women members of the Riksdag
Members of the Riksdag 2002–2006
21st-century Swedish women politicians
Members of the Riksdag 2006–2010